Kuhn poker is an extremely simplified form of poker developed by Harold W. Kuhn as a simple model zero-sum two-player imperfect-information game, amenable to a complete game-theoretic analysis. In Kuhn poker, the deck includes only three playing cards, for example a King, Queen, and Jack. One card is dealt to each player, which may place bets similarly to a standard poker. If both players bet or both players pass, the player with the higher card wins, otherwise, the betting player wins.

Game description 
In conventional poker terms, a game of Kuhn poker proceeds as follows:
Each player antes 1.
Each player is dealt one of the three cards, and the third is put aside unseen.
Player one can check or bet 1.
If player one checks then player two can check or bet 1.
If player two checks there is a showdown for the pot of 2 (i.e. the higher card wins 1 from the other player).
If player two bets then player one can fold or call.
If player one folds then player two takes the pot of 3 (i.e. winning 1 from player 1).
If player one calls there is a showdown for the pot of 4 (i.e. the higher card wins 2 from the other player).
If player one bets then player two can fold or call.
If player two folds then player one takes the pot of 3 (i.e. winning 1 from player 2).
If player two calls there is a showdown for the pot of 4 (i.e. the higher card wins 2 from the other player).

Optimal strategy 
The game has a mixed-strategy Nash equilibrium; when both players play equilibrium strategies, the first player should expect to lose at a rate of −1/18 per hand (as the game is zero-sum, the second player should expect to win at a rate of +1/18). There is no pure-strategy equilibrium.

Kuhn demonstrated there are infinitely many equilibrium strategies for the first player, forming a continuum governed by a single parameter. In one possible formulation, player one freely chooses the probability  with which he will bet when having a Jack (otherwise he checks; if the other player bets, he should always fold).

The second player has a single equilibrium strategy: Always betting or calling when having a King; when having a Queen, checking if possible, otherwise calling with the probability of 1/3; when having a Jack, never calling and betting with the probability of 1/3.

Generalized versions
In addition to the basic version invented by Kuhn, other versions appeared adding bigger deck, more players, betting rounds, etc., increasing the complexity of the game.

3-player Kuhn Poker 
A variant for three players was introduced in 2010 by Nick Abou Risk and Duane Szafron. In this version, the deck includes four cards (adding a ten card), from which three are dealt to the players; otherwise, the basic structure is the same: while there is no outstanding bet, a player can check or bet, with an outstanding bet, a player can call or fold. If all players checked or at least one player called, the game proceeds to showdown, otherwise, the betting player wins.

A family of Nash equilibria for 3-player Kuhn poker is known analytically, which makes it the largest game with more than two players with analytic solution. The family is parameterized using 4–6 parameters (depending on the chosen equilibrium). In all equilibria, player 1 has a fixed strategy, and he always checks as the first action; player 2's utility is constant, equal to –1/48 per hand.

It is not known if this equilibrium family covers all Nash equilibria for the game.

References

External links
Effective Short-Term Opponent Exploitation in Simplified Poker

Non-cooperative games
Poker variants
20th-century card games
Games and sports introduced in 1950